"Ask Me How I Know" is a 2017 song written by Mitch Rossell, and recorded by American country music singer Garth Brooks. It is the second single off Brooks's 2016 album, Gunslinger. The single's release coincided with the announcement of Brooks performing at South by Southwest, as well as the Houston Livestock Show and Rodeo. It became his first new number one song since "More Than a Memory" in 2007.

Charts

Weekly charts

Year-end charts

References

2017 singles
2016 songs
Garth Brooks songs